The California National Guard is part of the National Guard of the United States, a dual federal-state military reserve force. The CA National Guard has three components: the CA Army National Guard, CA Air National Guard, and CA State Guard. With a total strength of over 24,000 troops, it is the largest National Guard in the United States. , California National Guardsmen have been deployed overseas more than 38,000 times since 2001, during which time twenty-nine Guardsmen have been killed in Iraq and two have died in Afghanistan.

The Constitution of the United States specifically charges the National Guard with dual federal and state missions. When under the control of its state governor, National Guard functions range from limited actions during non-emergency situations to full scale law enforcement of martial law when local law enforcement officials can no longer maintain civil control. The National Guard may be called into federal service in response to a call by the President or Congress. 
 
When National Guard troops are called to federal service, the President serves as Commander-In-Chief. The federal mission assigned to the National Guard is: "To provide properly trained and equipped units for prompt mobilization for war, national emergency or as otherwise needed."

The Governor of California may call individuals or units of the California National Guard into state service during emergencies or special situations. The state mission of the National Guard is: "To provide trained and disciplined forces for domestic emergencies or as otherwise provided by state law."

Components
California Army National Guard (CA ARNG)
California Air National Guard (CA ANG)
California State Guard (CSG)

Military Museum Command
California State Guard's Military Museum Command interim state museum is Camp Roberts Historical Museum. militarymuseum.org is provided as a public service by the California Military Department.

Adjutant General
Major General Mathew Beevers serves as the acting Adjutant General of California since he was appointed by California Governor Gavin Newsom on 1 August 2022.

Adjutants General of California 
Theron R. Perlee, April 12 – October 5, 1850
William H. Richardson, October 5, 1850 – May 2, 1852
William Chauncey Kibbe, May 2, 1852 – April 30, 1864
Robert Robinson, January 1, 1864 – May 1, 1864
George S. Evans, May 1, 1864 – May 1, 1868
James M. Allen, May 1, 1868 – Nov. 23, 1870
Thomas N. Cazneau, Nov. 23, 1870 – December 21, 1871
Lucius H. Foote, December 21, 1871 – December 13, 1875
Patrick F. Walsh, December 13, 1875 – January 9, 1880
Samuel W. Backus, January 9, 1880 – July 1, 1882
John F. Sheehan, July 1, 1892 – January 11, 1893
George B. Crosby, January 11, 1883 – November 1, 1887
Richard H. Orton, November 1, 1887 – January 9, 1891
Charles Carroll Allen, January 9, 1891 – May 24, 1895
Andrew W. Bartlett, May 24, 1895 – December 23, 1898
Robert L. Peeler, December 23, 1898 – June 1, 1899
William H. Seamans, June 1, 1899 – January 3, 1902 (died in office)
George Stone, January 13, 1902 – February 15, 1904
Joseph B. Lauck, February 15, 1904 – January 7, 1911
Edwin A. Forbes, January 7, 1911 – June 18, 1915 (died in office)
Charles W. Thomas Jr., June 19, 1915 – December 15, 1916
James J. Borree, December 16, 1916 – November 30, 1923
Richard E. Mittelstaedt, December 1, 1923 – January 5, 1931
Seth E.P. Howard, January 6, 1931 – June 26, 1935 (died in office)
Paul Arndt, June 27 – October 17, 1935
Harry H. Moorehead, October 18, 1935 – January 3, 1939
Patrick J.H. Farrell, January 4, 1939 – June 10, 1940
Richard E. Mittelstaedt, June 10, 1940 – March 3, 1941
Joseph O. Donovan, March 3, 1941 – July 10, 1942
Junnius Pierce, July 14, 1942 – January 13, 1943
Ray W. Hays, January 14, 1943 – November 30, 1944
Victor R. Hansen, December 27, 1944 – April 28, 1946
Curtis D. O'Sullivan, April 29, 1946 – July 15, 1951
Earl M. Jones, July 16, 1951 – December 31, 1960
Roderic L. Hill, January 1, 1961 – January 1, 1967
Glenn C. Ames, March 22, 1967 – June 5, 1975
Frank J. Schober, June 6, 1975 – December 31, 1982
Willard A. Shank, January 3, 1983 – February 13, 1987
Robert C. Thrasher, February 14, 1987 – October 9, 1992
Robert W. Barrow, October 10 – December 31, 1992
Tandy K. Bozeman, January 1, 1993 – April 27, 1999
Paul D. Monroe Jr., April 29, 1999 – March 2004
Thomas Eres, March 2004 – June 6, 2005
John Alexander, June 7 – August 1, 2005
William H. Wade II, September 1, 2005 – February 1, 2010
Mary J. Kight, February 2, 2010 – April 15, 2011
David S. Baldwin, April 16, 2011 – July 31, 2022

Military academy
The California National Guard maintains the California Military Academy at Camp San Luis Obispo for the use and training of National Guard units from California and other states. Upon completion of Army Basic Training, OCS cadets will train a minimum of one weekend per month over a 16-18 month period before commissioning as a second Lieutenant in the Army National Guard.

See also
List of California State Militia Units 1850–60
List of California State Militia civil war units
California Military Department
California State Guard
California during World War II

References

External links
Bibliography of California Army National Guard History compiled by the United States Army Center of Military History
 Office of The Adjutant General
 California National Guard
 California State Guard
 California Military Museum
 California National Guard Photograph Collection US Army Heritage and Education Center, Carlisle, Pennsylvania

United States Army National Guard by state
National Guard
National Guard